Dotnuva Manor (or Akademija Manor) is a former residential manor 3 kilometers from Dotnuva in Lithuania. Until 1945 it was a part of Agricultural Academy township.

References

Manor houses in Lithuania
Classicism architecture in Lithuania